Angling Feelings is an album by the band Kaipa.

Track listing
"Angling Feelings" – 6:43
"The Glorious Silence Within – 7:16
"The Fleeting Existence of Time" – 12:34
"Pulsation" – 4:02
"Liquid Holes in the Sky" – 4:42
"Solitary Pathway" – 4:06
"Broken Chords" – 6:24
"Path of Humbleness" – 9:30
"Where's the Captain?" – 4:25
"This Ship of Life" – 4:40

All songs written by Hans Lundin

Personnel
Kaipa:
Hans Lundin: Electric, acoustic and virtual keyboards, vocals
Per Nilsson: Electric guitars
Morgan Ågren: Drums
Jonas Reingold: Electric basses
Patrik Lundström: Vocals
Aleena Gibson: Vocals

With Fredrik Lindqvist: Recorders & whistles (Track 1, 2, 8, 9 & 10)

References

Kaipa albums
2007 albums
Inside Out Music albums